The French St. Étienne Mle 1907 was a gas operated air-cooled machine gun in 8mm Lebel which was widely used in the early years of the First World War. The "St.Etienne Mle 1907" was not derived from the Hotchkiss machine gun. Instead it was an entirely different gas operated, blow-forward design borrowed from the semi-automatic Bang rifle of 1903. This Bang system was first transposed in 1905 to the French Puteaux APX Machine Gun which soon proved to be unsatisfactory. Then, two years later, the Mle 1907 "St-Étienne" machine gun followed as an improved redesign of the "Puteaux" machine gun. However the Mle 1907 "St-Étienne" was only a partial redesign: the original blow-forward gas piston, rack-and-pinion system, and bolt mechanism of the Mle 1905 "Puteaux" machine gun had all been kept only slightly modified inside the newer weapon. Eventually a total of over 39,700 "St-Étienne" Mle 1907 machine guns were manufactured between 1908 and late 1917. They were widely used by French infantry during the early part of World War I until their replacement by the more reliable Hotchkiss M1914 machine gun.

History

Around the turn of the century the French military evaluated machine guns made by the private French firm of Hotchkiss et Cie. While the tests were technically convincing, following which Hotchkiss machine-guns were purchased for French alpine and colonial troops, it was decided for political reasons that a machine gun for French line infantry had to originate from state-owned arms manufacturers. A first attempt by a French government arsenal near Paris (APX) was the Puteaux M1905 machine gun inspired by the first gas actuated blow forward Bang rifle system of 1903. It was a deliberate attempt to develop an infantry machine gun that would be mechanically different from the patented Hotchkiss Mle 1900 machine gun design. However, the M1905 Puteaux machine gun soon proved to be unsatisfactory. Consequently, the national arsenal at Saint-Étienne (MAS) thoroughly reworked and modified the Puteaux machine gun resulting in some measure of improvement but also increased complexity—64 component parts for the St-Étienne Mle 1907 vs. only 32 parts for the Hotchkiss Mle 1914. Barrel changes on the Mle 1907 St-Étienne were much easier than on the M1905 Puteaux and its firing rate could be set at any point between eight rounds per minute and about 600 rounds per minute. Either metal strips different from those used on the Hotchkiss machine gun or else fabric belts, the latter introduced in 1916, for the 8mm Lebel ammunition could be used.

George Chinn notes about the 1907 model that: "While it was gas actuated by means of a piston, the French reversed the conventional principle. Instead of the piston thrust rearward furnishing the source of energy to operate the piece, the gas propels the piston forward to unlock the bolt. The piston is attached by a spring-loaded rod to a gear rack. This in turn engages a spur gear which is fastened to an actuating lever. When the lever is in the forward horizontal position and engages a cam slot in the bolt, the gun is locked. Upon firing, the gas drives the piston forward, compressing the spring and causing the spur gear to rotate clockwise. The actuating lever turns with the gear for a half revolution, retracting the bolt and stopping at the rear horizontal position. The driving spring then forces the piston rearward, which reverses the action and returns the bolt to battery."

Nevertheless, in the muddy environment of trench warfare the mechanically complex St-Étienne Mle 1907 suffered from frequent stoppages and was difficult to maintain by front-line soldiers. A quote from a French post-war military evaluation says it all: "admirable weapon, patented clockwork, but very delicate and sparing its whims only for machine-gun virtuosos." In July 1917 the Mle 1907 St-Étienne was gradually withdrawn from front line service and replaced by the distinctly simpler and more reliable Hotchkiss M1914 machine gun. Large numbers of the M1907 St-Étienne machine gun were then transferred to military units in the rear, to the French colonies, and to the Italian Army. Many also ended up in the Greek Army during the 1920s. Altogether 39,700 Mle 1907 St-Étienne machine guns had been manufactured when the decision to close down their last assembly line was taken in November 1917. The Mle 1907-T was still in service at the beginning of World War II, for instance with second-line units.

Romania contracted 500 machine guns from France in July 1916; 268 were delivered until August when the war started on the Romanian front.

Users

: supplied during World War I. Also used during the Greco-Turkish War and the Greco-Italian War.

: used as an anti-aircraft weapon by the American Expeditionary Forces

References

Bibliography
 
  A 290 page technical review of all the automatic weapons known at the time.
 
  Includes the most complete and highly detailed technical review in existence of the Mle 1907 St-Etienne machine gun and all its accessories.

External links

  Animation showing the mechanism of St. Étienne model 1907.

8 mm machine guns
Early machine guns
Medium machine guns
World War I machine guns
French World War I small arms
Machine guns of France